Meleh-ye Shabanan (also Romanized as Meleh-ye Shabānān, Maleh Shabānān, and Mele Shabānān; also known as Maleh Shabānān-e Yek) is a village in Dowreh Rural District, Chegeni District, Dowreh County, Lorestan Province, Iran. At the 2006 census, its population was 32, in 6 families.

References 

Towns and villages in Dowreh County